"Infinite Dreams" is a live single released in 1989 by the British heavy metal band Iron Maiden. It is the only single to be released in sync with a home video; 1989's Maiden England. The performance was recorded in Birmingham, England in 1988 towards the end of the massive world tour to support the album where the song originally appeared, being Seventh Son of a Seventh Son. It was the band's final single to feature "The Trooper"-era lineup for an entire decade until 2000's single "The Wicker Man" with guitarist Adrian Smith leaving   the band in January 1990 after he did not approve of the direction the band were aiming for on their next album No Prayer for the Dying.

Synopsis
The song is about how the character of the song sees disturbing visions about afterlife and other mystic things in his dreams, but is scared about if he will ever be able to wake up again. It starts with a soft guitar solo, which is then joined by Bruce Dickinson's singing as well as the rest of the band. The song starts out quite peaceful, but gets progressively heavier towards the song's climax and the following final verse. Steve Harris has explained, “I do have nightmares, but usually only when we’re writing an album. Then your mind just gets so overactive with all these ideas flying about inside that it’s difficult to sleep. That’s what ‘Infinite Dreams’ is about.”

Track listing 
7" Single

12" Single

Personnel
Production credits are adapted from the 7 inch vinyl cover.
Iron Maiden
Bruce Dickinson – lead vocals
Dave Murray – guitar
Adrian Smith – guitar
Steve Harris – bass guitar
Nicko McBrain – drums
Additional musicians
Michael Kenney – keyboards
Production
Martin Birch – producer, engineer, mixing
Derek Riggs – cover illustration
George Bodnar – photography

Versions

Chart performance

Cover versions 
"Infinite Dreams" was covered on the album Across The Seventh Sea by the acoustic tribute project Maiden uniteD, featuring vocalist Damian Wilson and Apocalyptica cellist Perttu Kivilaakso.

It is also included on Covers All by Waltari.

Notes

References

Iron Maiden songs
1988 songs
1989 singles
Songs written by Steve Harris (musician)
EMI Records singles